Subban is a surname. Notable people with the surname include:

Jordan Subban (born 1995), Canadian ice hockey player
Malcolm Subban (born 1993), Canadian ice hockey player
Pernell Karl Subban (born 1989), Canadian ice hockey player, brother of Jordan and Malcolm